Cryptocephalus flavipes is a beetle belonging to the family Cryptocephalus.

Etymology
The genus name Cryptocephalus derives from Greek kryptós meaning hidden, and kephalē, meaning head. The Latin species name flavipes refers to the color of legs. It  derives from flavus meaning  yellow, and pēs meaning foot.

Distribution
This species can be found in Southern Europe, Asia Minor, Caucasus, Southern Russia and Central Asia east to Altai.

Description
Females are bigger than males. The basic body color is black, with yellow head and legs. Pronotum is convex, with lateral margins partly visible from above. The lateral margins of the body show a narrow, yellow stripe in males, while in females pronotum  is completely black.

This species is rather similar to Cryptocephalus bameuli.

Biology
Adults can be found from April to July.

References

External links
 
 
 Entomoland
 Galerie-insecte

Beetles of Europe
flavipes
Beetles described in 1781